Roberts Building may refer to:

in the United Kingdom
 Roberts Building (University College London), in Bloomsbury.

in the United States
(by state then city)
 Roberts Building (Great Falls, Montana), listed on the NRHP in Cascade County, Montana
Roberts and Mander Stove Company Buildings, Hatboro, Pennsylvania, NRHP-listed
Roberts-Banner Building, El Paso, Texas, listed on the National Register of Historic Places in Texas
 Roberts Building (Nacogdoches, Texas), listed on the NRHP in Nacogdoches County, Texas

See also
Roberts House (disambiguation)
Roberts Chapel (disambiguation) 
Roberts County Courthouse (disambiguation)